Marcos Baghdatis was the defending champion, but chose not to participate that year.

Sergiy Stakhovsky won in the final 7–5, 6–4, against Ivan Ljubičić.

Seeds

Draw

Finals

Top half

Bottom half

Qualifying

Seeds

Qualifiers

Lucky loser

Draw

First qualifier

Second qualifier

Third qualifier

Fourth qualifier

External links
Draw
Qualifying draw

Singles
2008 ATP Tour